Conserved oligomeric Golgi complex subunit 1 is a protein that in humans is encoded by the COG1 gene.

The protein encoded by this gene is one of eight proteins (Cog1-8) which form a Golgi-localized complex (COG) required for normal Golgi morphology and function. It is thought that this protein is required for steps in the normal medial and trans-Golgi-associated processing of glycoconjugates and plays a role in the organization of the Golgi-localized complex.

Interactions
COG1 has been shown to interact with COG4 and COG3.

References

Further reading

External links
  GeneReviews/NCBI/NIH/UW entry on Congenital Disorders of Glycosylation Overview